Třebenice is a town in Litoměřice District in the Ústí nad Labem Region of the Czech Republic. It has about 1,900 inhabitants.

Administrative parts
Villages of Kocourov, Kololeč, Lhota, Lipá, Medvědice, Mrsklesy, Sutom and Teplá are administrative parts of Třebenice.

Notable people
Jaro Křivohlavý (1925–2014), psychologist and writer

References

External links

Cities and towns in the Czech Republic
Populated places in Litoměřice District